Hella Kürty (1900–1954) was a German actress and singer. An operetta performer, she originated the role of Mi in Franz Lehar's 1929 work The Land of Smiles alongside Richard Tauber. The following year she appeared in a film version of the operetta.

Of Jewish background, she was forced to emigrate from Germany following the Nazi takeover in 1933. She emigrated to Britain, settling in London.

Selected filmography
 The Transformation of Dr. Bessel (1927)
 A Crazy Night (1927)
 A Day of Roses in August (1927)
 Diary of a Coquette (1929)
 The Land of Smiles (1930)
 Candlelight in Algeria (1944)
 Hotel Reserve (1944)

References

Bibliography

External links

1900 births
1954 deaths
German film actresses
20th-century German women singers
Jewish emigrants from Nazi Germany to the United Kingdom